Zoran, My Nephew the Idiot is a 2013 Italian-Slovenian comedy film directed by Matteo Oleotto. It was screened in the Critics’ Week section at the 70th Venice Film Festival.

Plot
The divorced scoundrel Paolo lives close to the border to Slovenia in a little town in the Italian Province of Gorizia. He is so short of money that his former wife and her new husband invite him over each Sunday for a free meal. Due to the demise of an aunt from the other side of the border Paolo learns he has a nephew named Zoran. Paolo is not the paternal type but Zoran is a natural when it comes to darts. He senses there might be a fortune in reach if he adopts Zoran and registers him for an open tournament in Scotland.

Cast  
Giuseppe Battiston: Paolo Bressan
Rok Prasnikar: Zoran
Roberto Citran: Alfio
Marjuta Slamic: Stefanja
Riccardo Maranzana: Ernesto
Teco Celio: Gustino

References

External links

2013 films
Italian comedy films
2013 comedy films
2013 directorial debut films
Slovenian comedy films
2010s Italian films